Harvey Black Apperson (June 27, 1890 – February 2, 1948) was an American lawyer and politician who served as Attorney General of Virginia from 1947 until his death in 1948. Prior to this, he was a member of the Virginia State Corporation Commission and Senate of Virginia.

References

External links

1890 births
1948 deaths
Virginia Attorneys General
Democratic Party Virginia state senators
Virginia lawyers
20th-century American politicians
20th-century American lawyers
People from Marion, Virginia